Arctolepis is an extinct genus of placoderm fish, which lived during the Early Devonian period (408 – 307 million years ago). Fossils of Arctolepis have been found in what is now Norway and Michigan.

References

Placoderm genera
Placoderms of Europe
Early Devonian fish
Devonian placoderms
Phlyctaeniidae
Fossils of Norway
Fossils of the United States